Sam Black Church, known today as Sam Black United Methodist Church, is an historic Carpenter Gothic-style church located at Sam Black Church near the unincorporated community of Smoot in Greenbrier County, West Virginia.

The historic white frame church was built in 1902 and named in honor of Reverend Sam Black, a circuit-riding Southern Methodist preacher who died in 1899. It is a small one story building with a gable roof. It features a square, open bell tower with a hipped roof. It is located at the intersection of Interstate 64 and U.S. Route 60 on the Midland Trail, a National Scenic Byway.

It was listed on the National Register of Historic Places in 1999.

References

Buildings and structures in Greenbrier County, West Virginia
Carpenter Gothic church buildings in West Virginia
Churches on the National Register of Historic Places in West Virginia
Churches completed in 1902
20th-century Methodist church buildings in the United States
United Methodist churches in West Virginia
National Register of Historic Places in Greenbrier County, West Virginia
Southern Methodist churches in the United States